Marcus Ragnarsson (born August 13, 1971) is a Swedish former professional ice hockey defenseman. His last team was Djurgårdens IF of the Elitserien. He previously played nine seasons in the National Hockey League (NHL) for the San Jose Sharks and Philadelphia Flyers.

Playing career
Ragnarsson was drafted by the San Jose Sharks in the fifth round, 99th overall, in the 1992 NHL Entry Draft. He enjoyed tremendous success paired alongside Mike Rathje in San Jose. During a disastrous 2002–03 season for San Jose, Ragnarsson was traded to the Philadelphia Flyers for Dan McGillis. During the NHL lockout, Ragnarsson retired from the NHL and returned to play in his native Sweden. On November 8, 2010, Ragnarsson officially announced his retirement from hockey due to repeated injuries.

Personal life
Ragnarsson's son Jakob Ragnarsson is a professional hockey defenseman who plays for Timrå IK in HockeyAllsvenskan.  Jakob was drafted by the New York Rangers with the 70th pick in the 3rd round of the 2018 NHL Entry Draft. His nephew Gustav Lindström was chosen in the second round of the 2017 NHL Entry Draft by the Detroit Red Wings.

Awards
2001 NHL All-Star Game

Career statistics

Regular season and playoffs

International

References

External links
 

1971 births
Djurgårdens IF Hockey players
Ice hockey players at the 1998 Winter Olympics
Ice hockey players at the 2002 Winter Olympics
Living people
National Hockey League All-Stars
Olympic ice hockey players of Sweden
Philadelphia Flyers players
San Jose Sharks draft picks
San Jose Sharks players
Swedish expatriate ice hockey players in the United States
Swedish ice hockey defencemen
Nacka HK players